San Roque González de Santa Cruz is a distrito in the Paraguarí Department of Paraguay, it is located 97 km from Asunción, the capital of the country.

The National Route 1, crosses through this city.

Populated places in the Paraguarí Department